Survival skills are techniques to be able to survive in an environment.

Survival Skill or variation, may also refer to:

 Survival Skills (album), a 2009 album by KRS-One and Buckshot
 "Survival Skill" (song), a 2009 single and song by KRS-One and Buckshot off the eponymous album Survival Skills (album)
 Survival Skills (film), a 2020 U.S. comedy-horror film
 "Survival Skills" (episode), a 1999 TV episode of Beverly Hills 90210 (season 9)
 "Survival Skills" (segment), a segment from the radio quiz show That! Medical Quiz Show
 Survival Skills (books; aka "SS"), a series of books by Joy Berry
 The Novel: A Survival Skill (book), a 2015 book by Tim Parks

See also

 
 Survivalism, prepper
 Bushcraft
 
 
 Survival (disambiguation)
 Skill (disambiguation)